George W. Dunaway (July 24, 1922 – February 6, 2008) was a United States Army soldier who served as the second Sergeant Major of the Army. He was sworn in on September 1, 1968, and served until his term ended in September 1970.

Early life
Dunaway was born in Richmond, Virginia, on July 24, 1922.

Military career
After attending the Airborne Course in August 1943, Dunaway remained at Fort Benning, Georgia, as an Airborne School Instructor until January 1945 when he joined the 517th Parachute Regimental Combat Team in France as a platoon sergeant. He returned to Fort Benning in December 1945 with assignment to the 501st Parachute Infantry Battalion, where he served as first sergeant of Company A. (Inactivated in Germany on 20 August 1945, the 501st Parachute Infantry Regiment was reactivated at Fort Benning from 1 August 1946 to 23 November 1948 as the 501st Parachute Infantry Battalion.) In March 1948, Dunaway was reassigned to the 82d Airborne Division at Fort Bragg, North Carolina. There he became a member of the 505th Airborne Infantry Regiment as Operations Sergeant, ascending to the regimental sergeant major position in 1952. 

In early 1954 Dunaway transferred to the 187th Airborne Regimental Combat Team as the Combat Team Sergeant Major. He continued in that position for seven years, during which he saw the lineage of the unit reorganized and redesignated as the 187th Infantry, when the 101st Airborne Division was reactivated on September 21, 1956, at Fort Campbell, Kentucky, which included the 2d Airborne Battle Group, 187th Infantry as one of the division's five battle groups. Departing Fort Campbell in 1961, he reported to the 1st Special Forces Group, 1st Special Forces in United States Army Pacific and later moved to the 5th Special Forces Group in Vietnam, where he remained until June 1967.

Returning to the United States, Dunaway re-joined the 101st Airborne Division as it prepared to move to Vietnam in the largest unit deployment by air in the history of the Vietnam War. Dunaway arrived in Vietnam with the commanding general's command group on December 13, 1967. In February 1968, he moved to Camp Eagle in the I Corps Tactical Zone with the division, where he remained until July 1968 when he was selected as the second Sergeant Major of the Army.

Later life
Dunaway died on February 6, 2008, in Las Vegas, Nevada. He was buried in Arlington National Cemetery on March 19, 2008, with full military honors.

Awards and decorations

References

 The Sergeants Major of the Army, Daniel K. Elder, Center of Military History, 2003

1922 births
2008 deaths
United States Army personnel of World War II
United States Army personnel of the Vietnam War
Recipients of the Distinguished Service Medal (US Army)
Recipients of the Legion of Merit
Recipients of the Silver Star
Military personnel from Richmond, Virginia
Recipients of the Air Medal
Sergeants Major of the Army